Ciudad de la Costa is a city in Canelones Department of Uruguay, on the banks of the Río de la Plata between the streams Arroyo Carrasco and Arroyo Pando. It is considered an extension of the metropolitan area of Montevideo which it borders to the west, while to the east it borders Costa de Oro. It was declared a city on 19 October 1994 and given its current name. At the 2011 census, it was the second most populated city of Uruguay between Montevideo and  Salto.

Ciudad de la Costa is also the name of the municipality to which the city belongs, but which does not include the area of Barra de Carrasco.

History 
The area, characterized by a sandy beach 16 km long, was known as "Rincón de Carrasco" during the 19th century. It was populated gradually during the 20th century, forming a series of resorts starting from Barra de Carrasco in the west, up to El Pinar in the east. The various resorts became characterized by a high floating population that inhabited the area only in summer or on weekends, while most of the permanent population worked in Montevideo.

The abundance of sandy soils made possible the existence of multiple sand pits, which gave rise to the various lakes that characterize the area. Some lakes are used for bathing and water sports, while others are not suitable for these applications and, instead, act as a refuge for many species of birds and animals.

Population

Since the 1980s there was an explosive growth of population due to an expansive process of Montevideo. According to the census of 1996, its population reached 66,402 inhabitants, 92.6% more than in 1985. The various resorts began to merge to form a unit that actually led to its declaration as a city. The growth in subsequent years has continued at a slower pace. At the census of 2004, the population was 83,888 inhabitants, 28.8% more than in 1996. The coastal city is the largest satellite town of the metropolitan area and the third largest city in Uruguay.

In 2010, the Intendencia de Canelones recorded a population of 79,412 for the municipality during the elections.

The census 2011 results show a total population of 95,176 inhabitants. This number reflects the total sum of the neighborhoods that belong to the municipality. The Instituto Nacional de Estadística, however, has posted some more areas, outside the municipality, as parts of Ciudad de la Costa, a detailed count of which is given in a separate table below. Were these areas to be counted in, the population would rise to 112,447, making it thus the second largest city of Uruguay. There are no other official sources supporting this count, however, leaving Salto as the second city in terms of population.

The population growth has not been accompanied by an adequate development of infrastructure services, so that much of the city lacks public sanitation and many roads are often impassable during rainy periods. Despite these difficulties, the Ciudad de la Costa is now a commercial and tourist centre of importance in the country. The Carrasco International Airport is located north of the city, and Autodromo Victor Borrat Fabini to the east.

Geography

Climate
Ciudad de la Costa has a humid subtropical climate typical of the region, with warm to hot and wet summers and mild winters with relatively evenly distributed precipitation year-round.

Coastal resorts of Ciudad de la Costa 
Population of the resorts according to 2011 census.

The area of Lomas de Solymar also contains Parque de Solymar, Montes de Solymar and Médanos de Solymar.
Postal code 15007 has been assigned to Médanos de Solymar.

Other entities part of Ciudad de la Costa (city) 
The 2011 census results mention the following non-coastal censual areas as parts of Ciudad de la Costa. These areas do not belong to the municipality of Ciudad de la Costa. See section Population above.

Landmarks
North of the Ruta Interbalnearia there is a private cemetery, Parque del Recuerdo.

See also
 Canelones
 Costa de Oro

References

External links
 INE maps of Ciudad de la Costa resorts: Barra de Carrasco, Parque Carrasco, Shangrilá, San José de Carrasco, Lagomar, El Bosque, Solymar, Colinas de Solymar, Lomas de Solymar. El Pinae

 
Populated places in the Canelones Department